The Homeland Party is a right-wing, nationalist and conservative, political party in Turkey. The party was founded on 2002 by Saadettin Tantan. In the 2002 elections, the party won 0.9% of the vote and got no seats.

The YP announced their participation in the June 2015 general election, making it the first time in 13 years that the party participated in the country's general elections. The party obtained 9,289 votes (0,02%) and won no seat.

External links

References

2002 establishments in Turkey
Conservative parties in Turkey
Motherland Party (Turkey)
National conservative parties
Nationalist parties in Turkey
Political parties established in 2002
Political parties in Turkey